October Moth is a 1960 British drama film directed by John Kruse and starring Lana Morris and Lee Patterson.

It was made at Beaconsfield Studios as a second feature for distribution by Rank.

Plot
In an isolated Yorkshire farm house, a deranged young man (Lee Patterson) imagines a car crash victim (Sheila Raynor) is his long deceased mother. Meanwhile, his sister Molly (Lana Morris), attempts to summon help for the unconscious woman, but against her brother's wishes.

Cast
 Lana Morris as Molly 
 Lee Patterson as Finlay 
 Peter Dyneley as Tom     
 Robert Cawdron as Police Constable  
 Sheila Raynor as The Woman

Critical reception
TV Guide wrote, "Had this been done with some sensitivity, it could have been an interesting drama. However, the treatment here is depressing, catering to the basest elements of melodramatic structure, and it ends up a second-rate production"; whereas more recently, the psychtronickinematograph called the film "a tight and taut little psychodrama that packs a lot of character orientated punch into its brief (like the lifecycle of the lepidopterous insect of the title) 54 minute span."

References

Bibliography
 Palmer, Scott. British Film Actors' Credits, 1895-1987. McFarland, 1998.

External links

1960 films
British drama films
1960 drama films
Films scored by Humphrey Searle
Films shot at Beaconsfield Studios
British black-and-white films
Films set in Yorkshire
1960s English-language films
1960s British films